"Drowning" is a song by American alternative rock band Hootie & the Blowfish. It was released in November 1995 as the fifth and final single from their debut album Cracked Rear View (1994). The song originally appeared on the group's 1991 cassette EP Time.

Content
The song centers on themes of prejudice and racism, and drew attention to the "rebel" flags displayed at the South Carolina State House at the time, twenty years before that symbol was removed by a vote of the state's legislature. The lyrics reference rap group Public Enemy: "PE's coming is all I gotta say. Wanna turn and run away. They're just telling you how they see it." They also reference singer Nanci Griffith, and her 1989 song "It's a Hard Life Wherever You Go."

Chart performance
"Drowning" was not as successful as Cracked Rear Views first four singles, and failed to chart anywhere else except the Billboard Mainstream Rock Tracks chart, where it peaked at number 21 in November 1995.

References

1991 songs
1995 singles
Hootie & the Blowfish songs
Songs written by Darius Rucker
Song recordings produced by Don Gehman
Atlantic Records singles
Songs written by Jim Sonefeld
Songs written by Mark Bryan
Songs against racism and xenophobia